Tungstite is a hydrous tungsten oxide mineral with formula: WO3·H2O. It is a secondary mineral formed by the weathering of other tungsten containing minerals. It crystallizes in the orthorhombic system in translucent yellow to yellow green masses. It is clay-like with Mohs hardness of 2.5 and a specific gravity of 5.5.

It was first described in 1868 for an occurrence near Trumbull, Connecticut at the Hubbard Tungsten Mine at Long Hill.

References

Mindat with location data
Webmineral
 Handbook of mineralogy

Tungsten minerals
Hydroxide minerals
Trumbull, Connecticut
Orthorhombic minerals
Minerals in space group 62